Rungis is a commune in the southern suburbs of Paris, France, in the département of Val-de-Marne.

It is best known as the location of the large wholesale food market serving the Paris metropolitan area and beyond, the Marché d'Intérêt National de Rungis, said to be the largest food market in the world.

The name Rungis was recorded for the first time in a royal charter of 1124 as Rungi Villa.

Economy
Rungis is the home base for the headquarters of the Système U supermarket cooperative, Corsair International (previously Corsairfly) and HOP! airlines, and MGA Entertainment's France division.

Prior to its disestablishment, Air Liberté was headquartered in Rungis. Airlinair previously had its head office in Rungis. In 2013 Airlinair merged into HOP!

Transport

Rungis is served by Rungis – La Fraternelle station on Paris RER line C.

Population

Education
The community has two preschools (écoles maternelles), Médicis and Les Sources; two elementary schools, Les Antes and La Grange; and one junior high school, collège les Closeaux.

Post-secondary education:
 Institut aéronautique Jean Mermoz

See also

 Les Halles
Communes of the Val-de-Marne department

References

External links

 Rungis town hall official website 

Communes of Val-de-Marne